"You and Me Against the World" is a song written by Kenny Ascher and Paul Williams, recorded by Helen Reddy for her 1974 album Love Song for Jeffrey.

"You and Me Against the World" was the first written by Williams teaming up with Ascher, a member of his band.  It began as a gag song.  Williams and Ascher had a discussion about their favorite songwriters which led to the spontaneous composition on the subject whose tune, Ascher then realized, had real hit potential.  The song is sentimental in its lyrics, discussing "all the times we cried" and "when one of us is gone and one is left to carry on."

Williams himself debuted "You and Me Against the World" on his 1974 album Here Comes Inspiration, singing it as a traditional love ballad. Helen Reddy considered the lyrics too "paternalistic" to be convincing as a woman's declaration of love for a man.  Instead, she interpreted it as a mother singing to a child, which her version clarified by her young daughter Traci's speaking to "Mommy" at the start and end. Williams’s version includes additional lyrics pertaining to circus: “Life can be circus/They underpay and overwork us/Though we seldom get our due/And when each day is through/I bring my tired body home/And look around for you...”

Released as the second single from Love Song For Jeffrey, "You and Me Against the World" reached Number 9 on the Billboard Hot 100 in September 1974 and became the fourth of Reddy's six consecutive Adult Contemporary Number Ones.  The song did equally well in Canada.

Charts

Weekly charts

Year-end charts

Cover versions
"You and Me Against the World" had also been recorded by Ann Burton, Robert Goulet, Gladys Knight and the Pips, Vera Lynn, Johnny Mathis, Matt Monro, and Matt Monro Jr. A Swedish rendering, "Du Och Jag Emot En Värld", was recorded by Lill-Babs.

See also
List of number-one adult contemporary singles of 1974 (U.S.)

References

External links
 

1974 singles
Helen Reddy songs
Songs written by Paul Williams (songwriter)
Songs with music by Kenneth Ascher
Capitol Records singles
1974 songs